Fleury-Mérogis Prison (Maison d'arrêt de Fleury-Mérogis) is a prison in France, located in the town of Fleury-Mérogis, in the southern suburbs of Paris. With more than 4,100 prisoners, it is the largest prison in France. It is operated by the Ministry of Justice.

Fleury-Mérogis is notorious as a leading center of Islamist radicalization in European prisons.

History
Built between 1964 and 1968, the 180 hectare complex of Fleury-Mérogis comprises four entities:
 a large men's jail;
 a smaller women's jail;
 a juveniles' jail;
 Gendarmerie barracks.

The main prison is formed by a polygonal central building from which radiate five blocks, each one consisting of three wings with four levels of cells. Each block has a capacity of 900 prisoners.

Fleury-Mérogis is one of the three main prisons of the Paris area, the Fresnes Prison (the second largest in France) and the La Santé Prison (located in the centre of Paris) being the other two.

Characteristics
There is wire surrounding the top of the building, preventing helicopter and other possible escapes. The bottom of the building is enclosed with trash that the prisoners have thrown.

While overcrowded (at 143% capacity , with over 4,300 inmates), Fleury-Mérogis is still under less population stress than other locations such as Fresnes Prison and Villepinte Prison.

Notable inmates
Infamous and notable past and present prisoners include:

 Salah Abdeslam (connected to the planning of the November 2015 Paris attacks and the 2016 Brussels bombings)
 Joëlle Aubron (member of Action directe revolutionary group)
 Djamel Beghal
 Georges Cipriani (member of Action directe revolutionary group)
 Amedy Coulibaly (one of three perpetrators of the January 2015 Île-de-France attacks)
 Christine Deviers-Joncour (protagonist of the Elf scandal)
 Hassan Diab (sociologist) (accused of first degree murder in 1980 Paris synagogue bombing, charges dropped, and released)
 JoeyStarr (sentenced for six months)
 Herve Ryssen (Herve Lalin) far right commentator.
 Chérif Kouachi (connected to the planning of the November 2015 Paris attacks and the 2016 Brussels bombings)
 Saad Lamjarred (accused of rape of a 20-year old woman)
 Jacques Mesrine (one of France's most notorious criminals)
 David Noakes British citizen and promoter of the unproven therapy GcMAF
 Thierry Paulin
 Petr Pavlensky (held while awaiting trial for political performance art resulting in property damage)
 Pascal Payet (Paroled in April 2019)
 Sinik (sentenced four times)
 Zouzou (for recreational drug use)

Notes

External links

 Fleury-Mérogis - Etablissement pénitentiaire - maison d'arrêt - Ministry of Justice of France 

GIGN missions
Prisons in France
Buildings and structures in Essonne
1968 establishments in France
Buildings and structures completed in 1968